Eric Earl Murphy (born 1979) is a United States circuit judge of the United States Court of Appeals for the Sixth Circuit and former Solicitor General of Ohio.

Biography 

Murphy earned his Bachelor of Arts, summa cum laude, from Miami University. He received his Juris Doctor with high honors from the University of Chicago Law School, where he was inducted into the Order of the Coif and was a member of the University of Chicago Law Review. After graduating from law school, Murphy served as a law clerk to Judge J. Harvie Wilkinson III of the United States Court of Appeals for the Fourth Circuit. He then clerked for Associate Justice Anthony Kennedy of the Supreme Court of the United States. Murphy later joined the Columbus, Ohio, office of Jones Day as part of the Issues and Appeals practice group. He became the Solicitor General of Ohio under Attorney General Mike DeWine in 2013.

Federal judicial service 

On June 7, 2018, President Donald Trump announced his intent to nominate Murphy to serve as a United States Circuit Judge of the United States Court of Appeals for the Sixth Circuit. On June 18, 2018, his nomination was sent to the Senate. President Trump nominated Murphy to the seat on the United States Court of Appeals for the Sixth Circuit being vacated by Judge Alice M. Batchelder, who previously announced her decision to assume senior status on a date to be determined. In June 2018, U.S. Senator Sherrod Brown said he did not plan to return a blue slip for Murphy's nomination, while U.S. Senator Rob Portman said he planned to support Murphy's nomination. On October 10, 2018, a hearing on his nomination was held before the Senate Judiciary Committee.

On January 3, 2019, his nomination was returned to the President under Rule XXXI, Paragraph 6 of the United States Senate. On January 23, 2019, President Trump announced his intent to renominate Murphy for a federal judgeship. His nomination was sent to the Senate later that day. On February 7, 2019, his nomination was reported out of committee by a 12–10 vote. On March 6, 2019, the Senate voted to invoke cloture on his nomination by a 53–46 vote. On March 7, 2019, his nomination was confirmed by a 52–46 vote. He received his judicial commission on March 11, 2019.

Memberships 

He is a member of the Federalist Society.

See also 
 List of law clerks of the Supreme Court of the United States (Seat 1)

References

External links 
 
 Appearances at the U.S. Supreme Court from the Oyez Project
 

|-

1979 births
Living people
21st-century American lawyers
21st-century American judges
Federalist Society members
Jones Day people
Judges of the United States Court of Appeals for the Sixth Circuit
Law clerks of the Supreme Court of the United States
Miami University alumni
Ohio lawyers
People from Indianapolis
Solicitors General of Ohio
United States court of appeals judges appointed by Donald Trump
University of Chicago Law School alumni